The 2011 Men's Youth World Handball Championship was the fourth edition of the world event for youth handballers, which was held in Argentina between August 10–20, 2011. In accordance with the IHF regulations, only players born on or after 1 January 1992 were eligible to enter the competition. The minimum age for the participation was 16.

Denmark defeated Spain 24–22 in the final to win the title for the second time.

Venues
Two arenas were used, both in Mar del Plata.
Polideportivo Islas Malvinas (Capacity: 8,000)
Once Unidos (Capacity: 1,500)

Preliminary round
The draw took place at May 21, 2011 in Argentina.

All times are Argentina Time (UTC–3)

Group A

Group B

Group C

Group D

Knockout stage

Championship bracket

Quarterfinals

Semifinals

Third place game

Final

5–8th place bracket

Semifinals

Seventh place game

Fifth place game

9–12th place bracket

Semifinals

Eleventh place game

Ninth place game

13–16th place bracket

Semifinals

Fifteenth place game

Thirteenth place game

17–20th place bracket

Semifinals

Nineteenth place game

Seventeenth place game

Final standings

Awards

All-star team
Goalkeeper: 
Left wing: 
Left back: 
Pivot: 
Centre back: 
Right back: 
Right wing:

Other awards
MVP: 
Most promising player:

References

External links
IHF Site
Official website

Men's Youth World Championship
Men's Youth World Handball Championship
Men's Youth World Handball Championship
H
World Handball Championship youth and junior tournaments